On Your Own Love Again is the second studio album by American musician Jessica Pratt. It was released on January 27, 2015, through Drag City. It is her only work with the label, as the 2019 follow-up Quiet Signs would be released through Mexican Summer.

Composition 
The songs on On Your Own Love Again are "dreamlike, radiant" folk songs, recalling musicians like Nick Drake, Angel Olsen and others. They have been seen for playing like acoustic dream pop songs, along with being "whimsically" experimental.

The album was recorded with a four-track, yielding a lo-fi aesthetic that showcases Pratt's "soft" vocals and fingerpicked guitar.

Critical reception

On Your Own Love Again was welcomed with critical applause upon release. On Metacritic, it holds a score of 79 out of 100, indicating "generally favorable reviews", based on 24 reviews.

Fred Thomas for AllMusic lauded the album, praising its songs' "undeniably powerful radiance". Jenn Pelly for Pitchfork called it "gorgeous", seeing it as "more dramatic and distinctive" than her debut. She noted how "its unadorned emotional uncertainty is profound and relatable."

Accolades

Year-end lists

* denotes an unordered list

Track listing
Adapted from Bandcamp.

Personnel
Adapted from Exclaim! and AllMusic's Credits page for Love.

Musicians
 Jessica Pratt - composer, electric guitar, engineering, mixing 
 Will Canzoneri - clavinet, organ, mixing 

Artwork and design 
 Colby Droscher - cover photo

References

 2015 albums
Jessica Pratt (musician) albums